Copelatus vitraci is a species of diving beetle. It is part of the subfamily Copelatinae in the family Dytiscidae. It was described by Legros in 1948.

References

vitraci
Beetles described in 1948